Anna Jakubowska ( Gasik, born 21 August 1988) is a chess player from Poland who holds the Woman International Master title.  She won the 2006 European Youth Chess Championship in the under 18 years old girls category. The competition was held in the coastal town of Herceg Novi, Montenegro. In 2008, she participated in Women's World Chess Championship in Nalchik, where she lost in the second round with Lilit Mkrtchian. She represents two European Chess Clubs, Polish: Polonia Warsaw and German: Hamburger SK.

Personal life
In 2016, she married Polish chess grandmaster Krzysztof Jakubowski.

References

External links

 

1988 births
Living people
Polish female chess players
Chess Woman International Masters
Sportspeople from Warsaw